The Journal of Supercomputing is an academic computer science journal concerned with theoretical and practical aspects of supercomputing. Tutorial and survey papers are also included.

Computer science journals
Supercomputing
Springer Science+Business Media academic journals
Publications established in 1987
Triannual journals